Dylan Jacob Macallister (born 17 May 1982) is a retired Australian football (soccer) player who currently coaches for Manly United FC in the National Premier League. He previously played for Australian clubs Sydney Olympic, Northern Spirit, Central Coast Mariners and Melbourne Heart, New Zealand club Wellington Phoenix, Norwegian clubs SK Brann, Lyn and Sparta Sarpsborg, and Hong Kong club Eastern Salon.

Club career

Sydney Olympic
Macallister was born in Manly, New South Wales .As a youth, he played for his local Manly Warringah Dolphins before moving on to Sydney Olympic (then known as the Olympic Sharks). He marked his professional debut for the club in 1999 by scoring in his first appearance.

Northern Spirit
Having won the 2001–02 National Soccer League with the Sharks, Macallister proceeded to join another club from Sydney, the now defunct Northern Spirit. Macallister was then supposed to have left for Switzerland and FC Aarau in August, but immediately regretted signing the contract. The transfer was eventually called off and Macallister instead continued playing for Northern Spirit until he was bought by the Norwegian club Brann in February 2004.

SK Brann
After some initial success – he scored two goals against Molde in the second round of the 2004 season – Dylan figured mostly as a substitute. He scored 10 goals in 38 appearances which equates to approximately 20 matches in terms of playing time. Macallister's first season was blighted by a fatigue injury and after a good start to his second season he suffered a training injury, sidelining him for eight weeks.

FC Lyn
Macallister was sold to Lyn on 29 March 2006 and debuted in the season opener against Start. He appeared in the starting line-up in his third and fourth matches, scoring a fine goal in the fourth, but failed to become a regular.

Following the end of the transfer dispute over Mikel John Obi and subsequent return of Lyn's other Nigerian players, Chinedu Ogbuke and Ezekiel Bala, Dylan Macallister was one of three non-EU players on the team at a time when Norwegian clubs were only allowed two non-EU players in their matchday squads. He was therefore loaned out to the First Division club Sparta Sarpsborg, from 16 August until the end of the season.

Sparta Sarpsborg
During his stay at Sparta he made nine appearances, scoring two goals. Sparta retained their spot in the league, but Macallister's season ended on a dull note as he was sent off in his last game. He returned to Lyn for the 2007 season, but made just five league appearances for the club, scoring no goals.

Central Coast Mariners
His contract with Lyn originally lasted to the end of the 2008 season, but it was announced on 28 March that he was released of his contract, and had signed with Australian A-League club Central Coast Mariners. He scored two goals on debut for the Mariners against the Queensland Roar.

Wellington Phoenix
On 13 May 2010, it was announced that he had signed a contract with the Wellington Phoenix in the Hyundai A league Australian Competition, bringing him to the capital to play as a target-man. In the highly publicised 2010 pre-season game v Argentina's Boca Juniors in the capital,
Macallister scored the opening goal in the 24th minute. Phoenix went on to win 2–1. He scored 7 league goals in 14 starts during his time with the club.

Breiðablik
Macallister signed for Icelandic champions Breiðablik on 16 May 2011. He made his debut on 22 May in a 3–1 win against Fylkir.

On 20 July 2011, Macallister scored Breiðablik's first ever goal in a European Competition, in a 2–0 win against Norwegian champions Rosenborg.

Gold Coast United
On 11 August 2011 it was announced he had signed a contract with A-League outfit Gold Coast United, scoring 5 goals in 15 appearances in the 2011/12 season.

Rockdale City Suns
On 25 May 2012, Macallister joined the NSW Premier League side Rockdale City Suns to maintain match fitness before his next top level stint. He scored 4 goals in 5 games.

Melbourne Heart
Macallister played for the A-League side Melbourne Heart in their opening game of the 2012/13 season against the Melbourne Victory, which they won 2–1; Macallister scored the winning goal in first half stoppage time. Now also runs a boys soccer team with former Albion Rovers legend Mark Leonard

Eastern Salon
Macallister was released from Melbourne Heart and joined Eastern Salon in January 2014. He has gained a cult like status in his short stint at Eastern Salon and is affectionately cheered on with the chant, "He's big, he's tall, he's going to score a goal, Macallister, Macallister!"

Return to Rockdale
Macallister signed for Rockdale City Suns in the National Premier Leagues NSW for the remainder of the 2015 NSW NPL season and the 2015 FFA Cup.

International career
Dylan Macallister has made several appearances for Australia's various age-specific teams. He participated in the 1999 FIFA U-17 World Championship, scoring three goals for his national side. Australia would go on to finish as runners-up behind Brazil. He later played for the U-20 team in the 2001 FIFA World Youth Championship. In the qualifiers for the 2004 Olympic Football Tournament he became Australia's top scorer with six goals in seven matches.

Macallister earned his first call-up to the Socceroo squad in 2009. He was an unused substitute in an Asian Cup qualifier against Indonesia in Jakarta on 28 January 2009.

Career statistics

Honours

Club
Sydney Olympic
NSL Championship (1): 2001–2002
Brann
Norwegian Cup (1): 2004
Eastern Sports Club
Hong Kong Senior Shield 2014–15
Hong Kong FA Cup 2013–14

International
Australia
 FIFA U-17 World Championship (1): 1999 (runners-up)

References

External links
 Wellington Phoenix profile
 Profile at lynfotball.net
 Oz Football profile

1982 births
Living people
People from New South Wales
Australian soccer players
Australia youth international soccer players
Australian expatriate soccer players
Expatriate footballers in Norway
Australian expatriate sportspeople in Norway
A-League Men players
National Soccer League (Australia) players
Eliteserien players
Norwegian First Division players
Central Coast Mariners FC players
Lyn Fotball players
Northern Spirit FC players
SK Brann players
Expatriate association footballers in New Zealand
Sarpsborg 08 FF players
Sydney Olympic FC players
Wellington Phoenix FC players
Melbourne City FC players
Eastern Sports Club footballers
Úrvalsdeild karla (football) players
Expatriate footballers in Iceland
Association football forwards